Nell Jackson (July 1, 1929 – April 1, 1988) was an Olympic sprinter and track coach. In 1956, she was the first African-American be named head coach of the U.S. Olympic Women's Track and Field Team. She also served as the head coach in the 1972 Olympic Games.

Early life 
Nell Jackson was born in Athens, Georgia, to Burnette L. Jackson and Wilhemina G. Jackson, and was the only daughter of three children.

Education
Jackson earned her college degree from Tuskegee Institute in 1951, a master's degree from Springfield College in 1953, and a Ph.D. at the University of Iowa in 1962.

Athletics
In 1944, at the age of 15, Jackson competed in the US national championships. In 1945, she competed in the AAU indoor and outdoor championships, placing second each time to Stella Walsh in the 200 meters.

While she attended Tuskegee Institute, she was a member of the 1948 US Olympic team. Lead by Tuskegee's Hall of Fame head football coach Cleveland Abbott, Jackson won two national collegiate titles in 1950, in the 200 meters and the 400 meter relay. She competed at the 1951 Pan-American games, placing second in the 200 meters and first as a member of the US 400 meter relay team.

Jackson set the American record for 200 meters in August 1949, running 24.2 seconds.

Jackson was inducted into the US National Track and Field Hall of Fame in 1989, a year after she died in Vestal, New York.

Championship results
1945 AAU: 200 m (2nd)
1945 AAU Indoors: 200 m (2nd)
1951 Pan-Am Games: 200 m (2nd)
1951 Pan-Am Games: 400 m relay (1st)
1950 NCAA: 200 m (1st)
1950 NCAA: 400 m relay (1st)

Coaching and athletics administration
In 1953, Jackson returned to Tuskegee to work as the women's track and field coach, later also serving as the first men's swimming coach after creating the Tuskegee swimming program in 1958. She subsequently coached track and field at four universities: Iowa, Illinois State, Illinois, and Michigan State. She was the head coach of the 1970 national champion track team at the University of Illinois.

In 1956, Jackson was the first black head coach for a US Olympic track and field team. She served as the head coach of the women's team at the 1956 and 1972 Olympics.  From 1973 to 1981, she served as the first Assistant Director of Athletics for Women at Michigan State University (MSU), and also served as MSU's women's track and field head coach for six seasons. She coached 13 athletes to All-America honors at MSU.

After leaving Michigan State in 1981, Jackson director of physical education and intercollegiate athletics at the State University of New York (SUNY).

Nell C. Jackson Award 
National Girls and Women In Sports (NAGWS) established the Nell C. Jackson Memorial Award. This award is presented annually to minority women who have demonstrated outstanding leadership in sports.

Notes

References

1929 births
1988 deaths
Sportspeople from Athens, Georgia
American female sprinters
Olympic track and field athletes of the United States
Athletes (track and field) at the 1948 Summer Olympics
American track and field coaches
Pan American Games medalists in athletics (track and field)
Pan American Games gold medalists for the United States
Pan American Games silver medalists for the United States
Athletes (track and field) at the 1951 Pan American Games
Medalists at the 1951 Pan American Games
20th-century American women
Olympic female sprinters